The Absence of King William Act 1689 (2 Will. & Mar. c. 6) was an Act of the Parliament of England which stated that Queen Mary II was to govern England whenever her husband, King William III, was absent from England. It did not apply to Scotland or Ireland.

The Act was passed because, following the Glorious Revolution, the Bill of Rights had enacted that although William and Mary were to reign as joint monarchs (with Mary as a queen regnant, not a mere consort), William alone was to exercise the actual power of government. However William intended to travel to Ireland, and so another Act was necessary to provide for the administration of the kingdom while he was abroad.

The Act declared that "whensoever and as often as it shall happen that his said Majestie shall be absent or continue out of this Realme of England It shall and may be lawfull for the Queens Majestie to exercise and administer the Regall Power and Government of the Kingdome of England Dominion of Wales and Towne of Berwicke-upon-Tweede and the Plantations and Territories thereunto belonging in the Names of both their Majestyes for such time onely dureing their joynt Lives as his said Majestie shall be absent or continue out of this Realme of England any thing in the said Act [the Bill of Rights] to the contrary notwithstanding".

References
The Statutes of the Realm, vol. VI, 1819.

Acts of the Parliament of England
Constitutional laws of England
1689 in law
1689 in England
William III of England
Mary II of England